Heather Henderson (born March 7, 1973) is a professional burlesque dancer, singer, model, filmmaker, producer, and podcast host who uses the stage name Baby Heather. She performs with Penn Jillette's No God Band and is an advocate for skeptical inquiry and atheism. In 2012 Henderson's Ardent Atheist podcast won The People's Choice Podcast Awards in the religion/inspiration category. From 1989 to 1991 Henderson was a regular performer on the Dance Party USA television show. In her teens, she released a single, "Give It Up Baby Heather", which received a positive review from Billboard magazine.

Early life
Henderson was born on March 7, 1973, in Camden, New Jersey. Her mother was a Hungarian Jew. When Henderson was 10, in 1983, her father left the home. She attended Camden City Public Schools for elementary, middle, and high school. She was a "shy and quiet girl" who did not talk back and listened to, and believed, everything her mother told her: "I did not grow up with critical thinking skills at all." Henderson's mother died when Heather was 23, in 1996.

Henderson's father, Ed Henderson, was a self-taught musician who worked as an EKG technician. He quit that job when Heather was seventeen in order to work full-time as a musician singing and playing the guitar and banjo. Henderson started singing with her father when she was seven. She also played the violin.

Growing up, Henderson knew that she wanted to be "a star". At age fifteen, she appeared on a nationwide teen dance show called Dance Party USA. She appeared on the show regularly for three years and went by the nickname Baby Heather. Her favorite musicians were Prince and Milli Vanilli, and her favorite actor was Michael J. Fox.

When Henderson's mother became involved with Jews for Jesus, they started attending progressive Christian churches. Henderson was very uncomfortable attending these churches because of how they treated the members. "I thought they were hypocrites," she said. According to Henderson, they made fun of people who were poor and of a family who had a child with a mental disability. In addition, they asked for "money all the time" and scared the kids by telling them that God is always watching them and they are going to go to Hell. "It was awful for me." As soon as she was old enough, Henderson told her mother she would not attend church again.

In 2011, Henderson moved to Los Angeles with friends. In order to raise money to purchase a plane ticket, she organized a fundraiser for herself with burlesque friends who donated their talent for a one-night show.

Film and television

Henderson was a regular dancer on the local television show Dancin' on Air and the nationally televised Dance Party USA from 1989 to 1991. In her last year, she became a co-host. Henderson has also appeared on Sesame Street, Nickelodeon's Double Dare, in the film Mannequin Two: On the Move, and on Disney's Annapolis.

Henderson is also one of the lead singers with Tritone's mainstay, Soulamite!

When she was sixteen years old, Henderson, along with her father, was interviewed while waiting to attend a Prince concert in Philadelphia. The reporter described her as "wearing a white and red polka-dot stocking and white boot on her left side and a beige stocking and black boot on her right. And that was all below the waist. For warmth, she had on a ruffled shirt and short black jacket." Of the way his daughter was dressed, Ed Henderson stated that "It's no big deal." Henderson stated that this was normal attire for the Dance Party USA show she was on.

Music and recording career

In her teens Henderson released a single called "Give it up Baby Heather" using her Dance Party moniker. Billboard magazine reviewed the single and said that it is: "Empowered with a sturdy voice and promising blend of style and attitude." And, "... her voice is put to good use... with a Paula Abdul like a chorus."

Henderson, as a fan of Penn Jillette, invited him to listen to some of her music and watch some of her videos, and soon after, they became friends. Jillette asked her to join his No God Band to perform at the yearly James Randi skeptic convention, The Amaz!ng Meeting. She has recorded background vocals for the songs, "Clay Aiken by Penn Jillette", "I Quit My Job - Love Theme from Director's Cut", and "Penn's Sunday School Theme".

The No God Band performed at The Amaz!ng Meeting from 2011-2014. At Jillette's Bacon and Donut party, he described the event: '"There will be obscenity, there will be scantily clad people, there will be bacon, there will be donuts, you will learn nothing."'

Henderson has said she is not interested in a career as a singer but will perform when asked. She does backup for Penn Jillette and for other projects by friends. She sings in an atheist choir in Los Angeles called the Voices of Reason Choir.

Burlesque career

Henderson worked from 1993 to 2010 in the erotica industry, doing stripping, burlesque, foot fetish parties, dominatrix work, and lap dancing. She has stated, "I'm hustling to be the everything girl." She wanted to be on stage and she was comfortable with her sexuality. She felt that this might be a great way to express herself while making money. Henderson sported a mohawk or sometimes a shaven head. Henderson got involved with burlesque after a friend who was doing a "variety" show asked her to sing background. "I became hooked! It was the kind of place where I could perform the silly to the sexy, and I made a whole new group of friends."

In 2007, Henderson performed with the Peek-A-Boo Revue burlesque troupe and appeared at the monthly event Pousse Cafe' in Philadelphia, where she explained her philosophy of burlesque. She stated that in this environment shy women (in time) are, "dancing around naked and doing cartwheels..." The other workers help each other out by boosting confidence and paying attention to egos. "Shy performers end up being molded into brazen unafraid actors and dancers." Henderson states that burlesque is about making fun of sex, "It's not so serious."

She eventually grew tired of the disrespect from club owners and customers and decided to get out of the trade in 2010. "Men come in there and they act like they don't know why we're there. Stop staring, give us a tip. We're working," she has said. Henderson felt that men were there for "faceless treats" and didn't understand that the industry is all about "fantasy with mutual respect." She states that she misses the experience and learned a lot, but the disrespect is why "I don't dance anymore," says Henderson. "Fuck 'em."

In 2013, Henderson returned to perform at the first Hollywood Burlesque Festival. Time Out Los Angeles lists her as one of the "Best Burlesque" performers and calls her "the singing emcee with 'ferocious vocals.'"

Modeling
Henderson was a model for Dr Sketchy's Anti-Art School Philadelphia chapter in 2008 and 2009. She has been painted by illustrator Julie Bell, and was pictured in her 2009 fantasy art wall calendar. She was on the cover of Heavy Metal Magazine with illustrations by Dave Palumbo. Henderson has her own Magic: The Gathering card entitled "The Deft Duelist", and in 2008 was the female model on the cover of Son of Hulk, published by Marvel Comics. In 2013, Henderson was used as a model in Tony Marsico's Wild Things: Burlesque Beauties and the Pets they Love.

Palumbo has used Henderson for a series of oil paintings.

Film making

After working in burlesque Henderson felt that she could film things that might make others uneasy. Using humor and music, she filmed several short fetish videos because "if others can do it so can I". Inspired by friend Norm Walker, her film PODONUTS features Walker eating cream-filled donuts off the feet of women (one of which is Henderson). Philadelphia Weekly states it "routinely wins over even the most squeamish spectators with its sex-positive message and thrillingly syncopated movement sequences." Henderson states that she enjoys being behind the camera and watching people act naturally without knowing they are being filmed. For this reason, she prefers to shoot documentaries.

Henderson's 2009 film Marcella and Sofia, a fetish film about a young couple being sexually corrupted by two female captors (one of which is Henderson), won a Claw Award for best cinematography from the Terror Film Festival.

In 2010, Henderson began recording interviews with strippers in the dressing room of the strip clubs. Women freely talked about their lives and the men they entertained. Henderson tried to keep the interviews focused on the women "exploring the spot where fantasy and reality collide."  Henderson released five of these interviews on YouTube but says she has more footage and would like to turn it into a documentary. She hoped that male listeners might understand "We're real people, and it's not cool to just open your mouth and have any kind of trash come out just because we are half-naked or even naked," she says. "We have feelings, we get hurt. We have your children. We're mothers."

Critical thinking

In a 2011 interview with John Rael, Henderson describe herself as an "ardent atheist" not an "angry atheist". She describes an atheist as someone who does not believe in any kind of deity. She says that atheists are all different and hold all kinds of other beliefs and that just because they call themselves an atheist does not mean they are skeptics. She thinks that it is important to start talking about religion. It should not be off the table because "once you start talking about the bullshit of religion... you start talking about what is really true, where are the facts... where do you draw the line?" In Henderson's view, religion is the worst abuser, second are psychics who claim to talk to the dead. They "play on their (sitters') sadness, pull the answers out of them and then take their money... that's bullshit."

When interviewer Chris Brown asked her how she came to her atheism, she stated that: "The thing that got me thinking was a movie I found called Zeitgeist... not so much the conspiracy theory stuff... but more about the Jesus story... I saw that and said 'I've lied to my entire life'." This prompted her to do research and find what was true. Henderson credits the Internet for continuing her education in critical thinking. She ventured into various chat rooms on all different topics and found people who thought just like her. After that, she credits magician Penn Jillette for challenging her to think skeptically about tarot, acupuncture, and psychics. She stated, "I had no idea that stuff was crap."

When her mother died in 1996 she was not yet an atheist, and Henderson discovered that she had cancer, "What kind of loving God does that to you"?  She describes becoming an atheist as getting struck by lightning, "I woke up!" she felt that her mother and "everyone around me had lied to me... I wanted to shout it out to the world."

Henderson has no problem with other people believing in God, as long as they aren't hurting anyone or making voting decisions based on their religious beliefs, "I don't see any reason to attack them for that."

When asked if her experience with religion and atheism is different because she is black she responded, "There are still so many African Americans who are stuck in the slave mentality their ancestors handed down to them. They don't ask questions or wonder why there are laws for slavery in the Bible. They haven't done the research about why slavery was allowed to continue for so long in the U.S. They just follow what their parents and their parents before did: tradition. It's sad."

In an interview on Fox 13 recorded at the American Atheist convention held in Memphis, Easter 2015, Henderson was asked about being public about her atheism, the reporter commented on her prominent Ardent Atheist tattoo across her chest and said "You obviously don't worry about it". Her response was that she lives in a very liberal area, Los Angeles, "...and most people don't care. This is just a conversation starter out there."

Podcasts

Henderson is the co-host of two podcasts with Emery Emery, Ardent Atheist and Skeptically Yours. They started producing the Ardent Atheist podcast in February 2011. "Emery is a professional comedian and knows a lot of comedians so that is what we started with." The show is like people talking in a "green room" with much arguing but with "love and kisses". She says, "I'm still learning, the show is my biggest teacher." The show is live-streamed every week using U-Stream. The show has a chat room which is published on the Internet for listeners to download. Ardent Atheists is "pretty raunchy... we have no restrictions on content."

Skeptically Yours is more mainstream, less about religion and more about other skeptical topics. Notable guests include, Brian Dunning, Mark Edward, Ian Harris, Dave Silverman, and Matt Kirshen.

In 2012, Ardent Atheist won best podcast in the religion inspiration category for The People's Choice Podcast Awards. Notable guests on Ardent Atheist include, Richard Dawkins, Neil deGrasse Tyson, Paul Provenza, Kelly Carlin, Jamie Kilstein,

From November 2012 to April 2013 Henderson appeared as a featured segment on the Skepticality podcast. Her segment was called News in Religion.

Skepticism
In 2014, Henderson became more involved in skeptical activism with various projects mostly focused on psychics.  Henderson and friends, Wendy Hughes and Henderson's partner Emery Emery, Brian Hart, Ed Clint, and Paula formed Investigation Network, a Los Angeles-based skeptic group.

In October 2014, Henderson joined Susan Gerbic's efforts to try and catch a psychic in a hot-read with Operation Bumblebee. Henderson and friends attended a Chip Coffey event in Los Angeles. She was not called on by Coffey but gained insight from her attendance and was able to provide intelligence to the San Jose crew to help them get selected by Coffey for readings. Operation Bumblebee was unable to catch Coffey in a hot-read, in their opinion his reading was no different than what would be experienced with a cold reading.

In Gerbic's next effort to catch a psychic in a hot-read, Henderson played the lead role of the believer in what Gerbic called Operation Ice Cream Cone. Henderson portrayed the bereaved mother of 13-year-old Andrew Hendersen. Gerbic and the team created several fake Facebook pages with full stories about their lives. The team members friended each other as well as various psychics that had a strong Facebook presence. They created a full history for mother and son Andrew, which Henderson was unable to view and had no knowledge but the basics of, this created a double-blind experiment as Henderson was unable to give guiding feedback to Brahn as she didn't know what was on her Facebook page. In November 2014, Henderson, with permission to record, had an hour reading with psychic Tim Brahn. He was able to clearly communicate with her non-existent sons, non-existent husband, and non-existent family. Operation Ice Cream Cone was unable to catch Brahn in hot-reading Henderson, in their opinion he used common cold-reading tactics. Full audio of reading is available on YouTube. Every statement Brahn made to Henderson is incorrect, including that she is a smoker, a mother, and a wife.

Other activities by the Investigation Network include protests and handing out flyers at various psychic presentations including Theresa Caputo, John Edward, and James Van Praagh.

Personal life

Interviewed by Ed Clint as a part of a series of Inspiring Women of TAM 2013 she was asked if she were a feminist. She stated that the term is very confusing as there are so many types of feminists. She understands that some people may feel that because she was a stripper for many years, men took advantage of her. She identifies herself like this, "I'll just declare myself a woman."

Henderson is an official Friar (pastor) for the United Church of Bacon, which started in 2010 when friends gathered at the home of Penn Jillette. The Church's mission statement is "Hail Bacon, full of grease, the Lard is with thee."  Their goal is to fight prejudices against non-believers, promote church and state separation, and raise money for secular causes.

In April 2015, Henderson and other secular groups protested Wells Fargo bank in Las Vegas over what they felt was discrimination and insensitive treatment by an employee when a member of the United Church of Bacon was refused a notarization.

In an interview with Apple magazine in July 2014, she talks about how important Apple is to her career in entertainment. She states that she uses Apple products for running podcasts, her private life, and even for managing the lights in her home (domed iMac PowerPC G4 processor). She uses Final Cut Pro and iMovie for her films. For recording the podcasts they use, a 2.4Ghz Quad-Core Intel Xeon Mac Pro, GarageBand, Saffire Mix Control, ATEM software, and a Blackmagic video card. Henderson started out as a devoted PC user until a boyfriend insisted that she try out Apple products. "I never looked back, I love the look of them, the efficiency... they are so easy to use, now I'm hooked!"

References

External links 
Official Audio Give it Up by Baby Heather
Ardent Atheist The Ardent Atheist Podcast
Skeptically Yours Skeptically Yours Podcast
YouTube Stripper Rant Podcast
YouTube Marcello And Sophia Movie - A short film by Henderson
YouTube PODOUNTS

1973 births
Living people
American atheism activists
American skeptics
American women podcasters
American podcasters
Musicians from Camden, New Jersey
African-American activists
African-American atheists
20th-century African-American women singers
American people of Hungarian-Jewish descent
21st-century American singers
21st-century American women singers
21st-century African-American women singers